Huxley is a former civil parish, now in the parishes of Hargrave and Huxley and Tattenhall and District, in Cheshire West and Chester, England. It contains four buildings that are recorded in the National Heritage List for England as designated listed buildings. Two of these are listed at Grade II*, the middle grade, and the other two are at the lowest grade, Grade II. Apart from the village of Huxley, the parish is entirely rural. The listed buildings consist of a former manor house on a moated site, a bridge across the moat, a farm building, and a canal bridge.

Key

Buildings

See also
 Listed buildings in Aldford
 Listed buildings in Beeston
 Listed buildings in Burton
 Listed buildings in Christleton
 Listed buildings in Clotton Hoofield
 Listed buildings in Duddon
 Listed buildings in Golborne David
 Listed buildings in Saighton
 Listed buildings in Tarvin
 Listed buildings in Tattenhall
 Listed buildings in Tilstone Fearnall
 Listed buildings in Tiverton
 Listed buildings in Waverton

References
Citations

Sources

Listed buildings in Cheshire West and Chester
Lists of listed buildings in Cheshire